Route 291 is a state highway in the western part of the U.S. state of Missouri. Its southern terminus is at I-49/US 71 in Harrisonville; its northern terminus is at I-435 in Kansas City. The route was once designated as US 71 Bypass. Route 291 serves as a main arterial road and commercial strip in Liberty and Independence.

Route description
Route 291 begins in central Cass County at an interchange with I-49/US 71 in Harrisonville. Here, the roadway continues as Cantrell Road. It travels to the north, intersecting Route P (203rd Street), and past Country Creek Golf Club. It has a brief concurrency with Route 58. Route 291 is a major highway in eastern Jackson County. In Lee's Summit, it has an interchange with Route 150. After it passes Shamrock Hills Golf Course, it has a very brief concurrency with US 50. After the two highways separate, Route 291 travels through the main part of the city and has an interchange with I-470. The two highways begin a concurrency for the remainder of I-470's length. They interchange with Strother Road, Woods Chapel Road, Lakewood Boulevard and Bowlin Road. After crossing over the Little Blue River and entering Independence, they have an interchange with US 40 (Cpl M.E. Webster Memorial Parkway) and I-70, where I-470 meets its eastern terminus. Route 291 continues to the north. It has an interchange with 39th Street. It crosses over a Kansas City Southern Railway line on the southeastern corner of Van Hook Park. After a more westerly jog, it intersects Route 78 (East 23rd Street South). Immediately after crossing over a Union Pacific Railroad line is an interchange with Truman Road. Farther along is an interchange with US 24. Route 291 passes to the west of Winterstone Golf Course and travels to the north-northwest. It crosses over Mill Creek. It then crosses over a Union Pacific Railroad line just to the west of the River Bluff Nature Preserve. The highway then crosses over the Missouri River on the Liberty Bend Bridge. On the northern shore of the river, it enters River Bend. In town is an interchange with Route 210. The highway enters Clay County and Liberty. Route 291 curves to the west and then to the northwest. It intersects the eastern terminus of Route 152 (West Kansas Street). It curves to the north and parallels I-35/US 69 before curving back to the northwest and meeting those routes at an interchange. Almost immediately is an intersection with the southern terminus of Route A (Church Road). Route 291 curves to the west and has an interchange with I-435, where it ends and turns into NE Cookingham Drive which is a road that leads to the Kansas City International Airport

History

The route was renumbered in the mid-1960s when I-29 was opened.

The county line stayed constant, however, leaving some of Jackson County north of the river. It was aligned on what is now the western frontage road in southern Liberty, Southview Drive, until the mid-1970s, when a four-lane Route 291 was built.

Route 291 was designated as "Route 35" from 1926 to 1939, and then "US 71 Bypass" until 1972. From 1922 to 1926, Route 35 took the western route between Harrisonville and Kansas City, while Route 1 followed present Route 291; US 71 replaced that part of Route 1 in 1926, but followed what had been Route 35, and so Route 35 was moved east to replace the piece of Route 1 bypassed by US 71.

Major intersections

See also

References

291
Transportation in the Kansas City metropolitan area
U.S. Route 71
Lee's Summit, Missouri
Independence, Missouri
Transportation in Kansas City, Missouri
Transportation in Cass County, Missouri
Transportation in Jackson County, Missouri
Transportation in Clay County, Missouri